Al-Kahrabaa Sports Club is an Iraqi professional football club based in the Rusafa District, near the Tigris river, Baghdad, that plays in Iraqi Premier League.

History
Al-Kahrabaa Sports Club was founded on 21 July 2001 by the Ministry of Electricity. They were promoted to the Iraqi Premier League for the first time for the 2004–05 season where they remained until they got relegated to the Iraq Division One in 2013. They were promoted back to the Premier League at the first attempt under coach Shaker Mahmoud, where they have remained since. During the 2017–18 season, Al-Kahrabaa finished fifth, their best season in history.

Al-Kahrabaa reached the final of the 2018–19 Iraq FA Cup for the first time in their history after beating Al-Talaba 3–0 in the semi-finals, but lost the final against Iraqi giants Al-Zawraa 1–0 at the national Al-Shaab Stadium. Al-Kahrabaa reached the final of the Iraq FA Cup again in the 2021–22 season, but were beaten 2–1 by Al-Karkh.

Club logo controversy
At the start of their history, Al-Kahrabaa used a badge that was very similar to the one used by Defensor Sporting, a club based in Montevideo.

Current squad

First-team squad

Out on loan

Current technical staff

{| class="toccolours"
!bgcolor=silver|Position
!bgcolor=silver|Name
!bgcolor=silver|Nationality
|- bgcolor=#eeeeee
|Manager:||Luay Salah||
|- 
|Assistant manager:||Usama Ali||
|- bgcolor=#eeeeee
|Goalkeeping coach:||Jalil Zaidan||
|- 
|Fitness coach:||Haider Abdul Qadir||
|-bgcolor=#eeeeee
|Team analyst:||Alaa Abd Aon||
|- 
|Reserve coach:||Adnan Abdullah||
|- 
|U-19 coach:||Ali Wali||
|- 
|Technical advisor:||Abbas Attiya||
|-
|Director of football:||Hussein Zahrawi||
|- 
|Managing director:||Juma Jaber||
|- 
|Administrative director:||Habib Jabbar||
|-bgcolor=#eeeeee
|Club doctor:||Qasim Mowhi||
|-

Managerial history
Since the club’s promotion to the Iraqi Premier League for the first time in 2004–05 fifteen coaches have led the team:

 Nabil Zaki 
 Adil Abdul-Ridha 
 Nazar Ashraf 
 Younis Abid Ali 
 Rajah Mohammed 
 Bassim Mohammed 
 Nabil Zaki 
 Shaker Mahmoud 
 Naeem Saddam 
 Sabah Abdul Hassan 
 Karim Farhan 
 Shaker Mahmoud 
 Hassan Ahmed 
 Nabil Zaki 
 Shaker Mahmoud 
 Ali Hadi 
 Khalid Mohammed Sabbar 
 Younis Al Qattan 
 Abbas Attiya 
 Khalid Mohammed Sabbar 
 Abbas Attiya 
 Ahmed Salah Alwan 
 Luay Salah

Honours
Iraq Division One (second tier)
Winner (1): 2013–14 (shared)

Iraq FA Cup
Runners-up (2): 2018–19, 2021–22

References

External links
 Team picture

Sport in Baghdad
2001 establishments in Iraq
Association football clubs established in 2001
Football clubs in Baghdad